Elections were held in Wellington County, Ontario on October 22, 2018 in conjunction with municipal elections across the province.

Wellington County Council
The council consists of the seven mayors of the constituent municipalities plus nine councillors elected from county wards.

Centre Wellington

Source:

Erin

Source:

Guelph/Eramosa

Source:

Mapleton

Source:

Minto

Source:

Puslinch

Source:

Wellington North

Source:

See also
2014 Wellington County municipal elections
2010 Wellington County municipal elections

References

Wellington
Wellington County, Ontario